The Camanducaia River is a river which rises in Minas Gerais and flows through São Paulo state in southeastern Brazil.

See also
List of rivers of São Paulo
List of rivers of Minas Gerais

References
Brazilian Ministry of Transport (São Paulo)
Brazilian Ministry of Transport (Minas Gerais)
 Rand McNally, The New International Atlas, 1993.

Rivers of São Paulo (state)
Rivers of Minas Gerais